Gilstrap is a surname. The name may refer to:
Person
Bob Gilstrap (born 1974), American mixed martial artist
Chena Gilstrap (died 2002), American college football coach
Gilstrap baronets, short-lived United Kingdom baronetcy of one baronet (1887–96)
Hunter Gilstrap (born 1983), American professional soccer player
James Rodney Gilstrap (born 1957), American judge, U.S. District Judge, Eastern District of Texas
Jim Gilstrap (born ~1948), American singer
Jim Gilstrap (coach) (1942–2007), American professional football coach
Mark Gilstrap (born 1952), American politician, Kansas state legislator
Places
Gilstrap Township, Adams County, North Dakota, USA
Gilstrap, Kentucky